North Danbury station is a proposed commuter rail stop on the Danbury Branch of the Metro-North Railroad's New Haven Line, to be located in Danbury, Connecticut.

History
Plans call for the station to be located at the current park and ride at 67 White Turkey Road Ext, adjacent to the Brookfield-Danbury border. Original plans for the station had surfaced in 2009–2010, when a study was conducted to determine the viability of the station. Although plans had gone under for a while, improvements being made to the line by the State of Connecticut could mean a station in the near future. In September 2020, due to an increase in demand for expansion of commuter rail service to Greater Danbury, the United States Department of Transportation awarded a $400,000 grant to the Western Connecticut Council of Governments to study improvements along the Danbury Branch line and develop a plan for expanding service north. This would include the construction of a North Danbury, Brookfield and New Milford station.

References

Stations along New York, New Haven and Hartford Railroad lines
Metro-North Railroad stations in Connecticut
Railroad stations in Fairfield County, Connecticut
Buildings and structures in Danbury, Connecticut